Elections to Calderdale Metropolitan Borough Council were held on 10 June 2004.  The whole council was up for election with boundary changes since the last election in 2003.  The council stayed under no overall control with a minority Conservative administration.

Council results

Council Composition
After the election the composition of the council was:

Ward results

Brighouse ward

Calder ward

Elland ward

Greetland and Stainland ward

Hipperholme and Lightcliffe ward

Illingworth and Mixenden ward

Luddendenfoot ward

Northowram and Shelf ward

Ovenden ward

Park ward

Rastrick ward

Ryburn ward

Skircoat ward

Sowerby Bridge ward

Todmorden ward

Town ward

Warley ward

References

2004
2004 English local elections
2000s in West Yorkshire